Michael Otis Chandler (born April 21, 1958) is a former driver in the CART Championship Car series.  He raced in the 1980-1984 seasons, with 9 career starts, and started in the Indianapolis 500 in 1981–1983. A near head-on crash in practice for the 1984 race left him in a coma for several days and prematurely ended his career. He finished in the top ten twice, with his best finish in 4th position in 1981 at Riverside.

Family
Michael is the son of Los Angeles Times publisher Otis Chandler and Marilyn "Missy" Chandler.

Racing record

Complete USAC Mini-Indy Series results

Indy 500 results

Notes

1958 births
Living people
Indianapolis 500 drivers
Indy Lights drivers
SCCA Formula Super Vee drivers
People from San Marino, California
Racing drivers from California
Racing drivers from Los Angeles
Sportspeople from Los Angeles County, California
Chandler family (newspaper publishers)